The South East Cork Junior A Football Championship is an annual Gaelic football competition organised by the Carrigdhoun Board of the Gaelic Athletic Association since 1929 for junior Gaelic football teams in the southeastern region of County Cork, Ireland.

The series of games begin in April, with the championship culminating with the final in the autumn. The championship includes a group stage, insuring that every team plays at least 2 matches.

The South East Junior Championship is an integral part of the wider Cork Junior A Football Championship. The winners of the South East Cork championship join their counterparts from the other seven divisions to contest the county championship.

The title has been won at least once by 14 different clubs. The all-time record-holders are Kinsale, who have won a total of 18 titles. 

Kinsale are the title-holders after defeating Ballinhassig by 2-15 to 0-04 in the 2022 championship final.

Teams

2023 Teams

Roll of Honour

List of Finals

Records

Gaps

Top ten longest gaps between successive championship titles:
 37 years: Shamrocks (1934-1971)
 32 years: Crosshaven (1966-1998)
 24 years: Tracton (1983-2007)
 22 years: Shamrocks (1994-2016)
 21 years: Carrigaline (1969-1990)
 21 years: Valley Rovers (1996-2017)
 21 years: Kinsale (1978-1999)
 19 years: Valley Rovers (1951-1970)
 17 years: Kinsale (2005-2022)
 15 years: Carrigaline (1940-1955)
 12 years: Crosshaven (1929-1941)

2022 Championship

Group stage 
Group 1

Group 2

Group 3

Knockout stage

References

External links
 Carrigdhoun GAA website

South East Junior A Football Championship